Benarat Cavern is a cave system situated in Mount Benarat at the northern end of Mulu National Park in Malaysia. As of 2011, it is the third-longest known cave in Asia at 50 km.

References

 
Wild caves
Limestone caves
Caves of Sarawak